George A. Best was an English football goalkeeper. He played professionally for Blackpool in the early 20th century, either side of spells with his hometown club, Worksop Town.

Best made his debut for Blackpool just over halfway through the 1925–26 season, as deputy for Len Crompton, in a 5–2 defeat at Derby County. He appeared in the two successive games — a 3–0 home victory over Bradford City and a 5–0 reversal at Port Vale — before Crompton returned to the line-up.

The following 1926–27 campaign saw Best make 24 League appearances. He played his final game for the club on 18 April, in a 2–2 draw at South Shields.

References

Year of birth missing
Year of death missing
English footballers
Association football goalkeepers
Blackpool F.C. players
Worksop Town F.C. players
Footballers from Worksop